Christian Mary McEwen, Dowager Lady Hesketh, OBE, DL (17 July 1929, Marchmont House, Greenlaw, Berwickshire, Scotland – 7 April 2006, London) was a British politician, journalist and educationist.

Early life
Christian McEwen was born on 17 July 1929 at Marchmont House, Greenlaw, Berwickshire, Scotland. She was the only daughter of Captain Sir John Helias Finnie McEwen, MP, and his wife, Brigid Mary (née Lindley).  Her brother was Rory McEwen (1932–1982), the artist.  She was brought up a Roman Catholic and educated at St Mary's School, Ascot.

Public service
From 1952–1983, she was county organiser for the WRVS and a member of the Arts Council from 1960 to 1963. She wrote several works of history and obtained a PhD from King's College London with a thesis published in 1999, The Political Opposition to the Government of Charles I in Scotland. She was a part-time journalist including rugby correspondent of The Spectator for a while.

In 1981, Lady Hesketh was appointed a Deputy Lieutenant for the county of Northamptonshire (as her husband had also been) and also served as High Sheriff in 1981. She was awarded the OBE in 1984.

Lady Hesketh was a chairman of Daventry Conservative Association and also became a County Councillor for Northamptonshire from 1989-1993, and Daventry District Councillor with special interest in education. She was chairman of the Governors of the Sponne School, Towcester.

Personal life
On 22 November 1949, she married Frederick Fermor-Hesketh, 2nd Baron Hesketh (1916–1955). Lord Hesketh was the son of Thomas Fermor-Hesketh, 1st Baron Hesketh and the former Florence Louise Breckinridge (a granddaughter of the former American Vice President John C. Breckinridge). They had three sons (a fourth son was stillborn soon after her husband's death.):

 Alexander Fermor-Hesketh, 3rd Baron Hesketh (b. 1950), who married Hon. Claire Georgina Watson, a daughter of Rupert Watson, 3rd Baron Manton.
 Robert Fermor-Hesketh (1951–1997), who was killed in a car accident
 John Fermor-Hesketh (1953–2008)

After her husband's early death, which left her a widow at the age of 25 with three young sons, she took charge of the family house and estate of Easton Neston, near Towcester, Northamptonshire. She had two serious motoring accidents, both on the M1 Motorway; in the second of these, in 1972, she lost an eye.

Following her death in 2006, a number of her jewels were auctioned off, including a diamond floral tiara and an aquamarine and diamond tiara. She was survived by her sons Alexander (the 3rd Lord Hesketh) and John.

References

People educated at St Mary's School, Ascot
Alumni of King's College London
1929 births
2006 deaths
Conservative Party (UK) councillors
Councillors in Northamptonshire
Hesketh
British Roman Catholics
British women journalists
British educational theorists
Officers of the Order of the British Empire
Daughters of baronets
Deputy Lieutenants of Northamptonshire
High Sheriffs of Northamptonshire
Women councillors in England